
Year 71 BC was a year of the pre-Julian Roman calendar. At the time it was known as the Year of the Consulship of Lentulus and Orestes (or, less frequently, year 683 Ab urbe condita). The denomination 71 BC for this year has been used since the early medieval period, when the Anno Domini calendar era became the prevalent method in Europe for naming years.

Events 
 By place 

 Roman Republic 
 Third Servile War ends; Slave rebellion under leadership of Spartacus is crushed by a Roman army under Marcus Licinius Crassus. Slaves taken prisoner are crucified all naked along the Via Appia.
 Marcus Antonius is defeated by the Cretans, who have made an alliance with the pirates. He is compelled to conclude a humiliating peace. Antonius dies in office the same year and is awarded, posthumously, with the cognomen Creticus.
 Nessebar in modern-day Bulgaria comes under Roman rule.

Births 
 Wang Zhengjun, Chinese empress of the Han Dynasty (d. AD 13)

Deaths 
 Castus, Gallic gladiator and rebel leader 
 Gannicus, Celtic gladiator and rebel leader
 Marcus Antonius Creticus, Roman politician (father of Mark Antony)
 Spartacus, Thracian gladiator and rebel leader (presumably killed in battle) (b. 109 BC)
 Xu Pingjun, Chinese empress of the Han Dynasty

References